Jón Ögmundsson or Ogmundarson (1052–23 April 1121), also known as John of Holar and Jon Helgi Ogmundarson, was an Icelandic bishop and local Icelandic saint. In 1106, the second Icelandic diocese, Hólar, was created in the north of Iceland, and Jón was appointed its first bishop. He served as bishop there until his death.

Influence
A religious purist, Jón made it his mission to uproot all remnants of paganism. This included changing the names of the days of the week. Thus Óðinsdagr, "day of Odin", became miðvikudagr, "mid-week day" and the days of Týr and Thor became the prosaic "third day" and "fifth day".

Jón's names for the days are still in use in Iceland today but despite the success of this cosmetic reform it appears that Jón did not manage to uproot the memory of the heathen gods. More than a century after his death the Prose Edda and Poetic Edda were written, preserving large amounts of pagan myth and poetry.

Jón's relic was translated to the cathedral of Hólar on 3 March  1200, a process called "translation" which made him a local saint. His feast day, 23 April (the date of his death) was decreed a Holy Day of Obligation for all Iceland at the Althing in the summer of 1200. These two events are distinguished in the Icelandic annals: Jón was not 'made a saint' by the Althing.

Jón never received as much veneration as the first Icelandic saint, Thorlak Thorhallsson. He was venerated primarily in the diocese of Hólar, and also at his birthplace, Breiðabólstaður in Fljótshlíð; relics were preserved at both these places.

Jóns saga
A Latin life (vita) about St. Jón was probably written by the monk Gunnlaugr Leifsson of the monastery at Þingeyrar in the early thirteenth century. Composed nearly a century after Jón's lifetime, its historical value is dubious. It is a classic example of hagiography for a confessor saint, aiming to praise the saintly virtues of its subject rather than record accurate historical information. The Latin original has not survived, but it was translated into Icelandic shortly after its composition and revised on subsequent occasions.

Editions and translations
Jóns saga Hólabyskups ens Helga. Ed. Peter Foote. (Copenhagen: Editiones Arnamagnæanae Series A vol. 14, 2003)
Biskupa sögur I (Íslensk Fornrit XV). Eds. Sigurgeir Steingrímsson, Ólafur Halldórsson, and Peter Foote. (Reykjavík: 2003).
 "Saga of Bishop Jón of Hólar", in Medieval Hagiography: An Anthology, ed. Tom Head. (NY and London, Garland: 2000) 595–626. Paperback edition by Routledge: 2002. pp. 595–626. (A partial translation.)
The Saga of St. Jón of Hólar, ed. and trans. by Margaret Cormack and Peter Foote (Tempe: Arizona Center for Medieval and Renaissance Studies, 2020)

See also

References

Further reading
 Gunnar Karlsson (2000). Iceland's 1100 Years : History of a Marginal Society. London: C. Hurst & Co. .
 Unnar Árnason. Hver var Jón Ögmundsson?
 "Saints of Medieval Hólar: A Statistical Survey of the Veneration of Saints in the Diocese", Peregrinations: Journal of Medieval Art and Architecture, vol. 3 issue 2 (summer 2011) pp. 7–37.http://peregrinations.kenyon.edu/vol3_2/Cormack%20article%20text%20onlyJUNE2011DONE-1.pdf
 The Saints in Iceland: Their Veneration from the Conversion to 1400, Subsidia Hagiogaphica 78, (Brussels, Société des Bollandistes: 1994). pp. 115–117.

External links
 http://www.katolsk.no/biografier/historisk/jholar
 http://www.catholic.org/saints/saint.php?saint_id=4898

1052 births
1121 deaths

Jon Ogmundsson

Icelandic Roman Catholic saints
12th-century Icelandic people